is a private university in Tsuchiura, Ibaraki Prefecture, Japan, established in 1994. The predecessor of the school was founded in 1946.

The affiliated  was established in 1966.

External links

 Official website 

Educational institutions established in 1946
Private universities and colleges in Japan
Universities and colleges in Ibaraki Prefecture
1946 establishments in Japan
Japanese junior colleges